Darren Dutchyshen (born December 19, 1966) is a Canadian sportscaster, who cohosts the evening edition of SportsCentre on TSN.

Broadcasting career

Dutchyshen started his broadcasting career as a sportscaster at what was then STV (now Global) in Saskatoon. After a year, he moved to IMTV in Dauphin, Manitoba. He then spent seven years as the host of ITV's Sports Night in Edmonton, where he also hosted a daily radio sportscast on 630 CHED for more than two years.

Dutchyshen joined TSN in 1995, as a host of TSN's weekend editions of SportsDesk and TSN's coverage of the Canadian Football League (CFL) during the football season. He also hosted TSN's Olympic Prime Time coverage during the London 2012 Olympic Games and Vancouver 2010 Olympic Games.

Dutchyshen currently hosts the evening edition of SportsCentre, alongside co-host Jennifer Hedger.

Personal life

Darren was born in Regina, Saskatchewan and grew up in Porcupine Plain, Saskatchewan. He graduated from the Western Academy Broadcasting College in Saskatoon.

References

1966 births
Living people
People from Regina, Saskatchewan
Canadian Football League announcers
Canadian television journalists
Canadian television sportscasters
National Hockey League broadcasters
Canadian people of Ukrainian descent